MT-RNR2-like 6 is a protein that in humans is encoded by the MTRNR2L6 gene.

References

Further reading